Topo Galileo (Galileo Mouse) is a 1988 Italian comedy film directed by Francesco Laudadio. The film was a box office bomb.

Cast 
 
 Beppe Grillo: Giuseppe Galileo
 Jerry Hall: Dr. 18
 Paolo Bonacelli: Professor
 Eros Pagni: Suicide General 
 Athina Cenci 
 Dagmar Lassander 
 Claudio Bisio

References

External links

1988 films
Italian comedy films
1988 comedy films
Films directed by Francesco Laudadio
1980s Italian films